The Story of The Tortoise & the Hare is a 2002 stop motion short film directed and animated by Ray Harryhausen. It is based on the Aesop fable The Tortoise and the Hare.

Production
Harryhausen began making the film in 1952, but abandoned it soon after, with only about 4 minutes of film completed. Around 50 years later, Seamus Walsh and Mark Caballero, two young fans of Harryhausen's work, learned about the unfinished film and asked Harryhausen if they could finish it with him. He said yes and the short was finally completed in 2002, 50 whole years since Harryhausen had started the production. With the exception of the tortoise, all of the original models were reused due to their survival through the years. Gary Owens narrated the film.

Accolades

See also
2002 in film
List of rediscovered films
List of films with longest production time

References

External links

2002 films
2002 animated films
2002 short films
2000s American animated films
2000s stop-motion animated films
2000s animated short films
American animated short films
Best Animated Short Subject Annie Award winners
Films produced by Ray Harryhausen
Films based on the Tortoise and the Hare
Films about turtles
Animated films about rabbits and hares
Films directed by Ray Harryhausen
2000s English-language films